Alticonodon is a genus of extinct mammal from the Late Cretaceous of North America. It is the geologically youngest known eutriconodont, and is a fairly more specialised animal than earlier representatives of this clade.

Description
Alticonodon is currently a monotypic genus, represented exclusively by A. lindoei. It is known from the Milk River Formation deposits of the early Campanian of Alberta, Canada. It is known from two specimens: a dentary fragment bearing two molars, and an isolated lower last molar.

Classification
Alticonodon has been consistently recovered as a triconodontid, and more specifically as an alticonodontine, though the latter term may be redundant in relation to the rest of Triconodontidae.

Biology
Compared to earlier eutriconodonts, Alticonodon has molars better specialised for shearing. As eutriconodonts as a group had shearing molars due to their carnivorous habits, it can be inferred that Alticonodon was hypercarnivorous.

This ecological speciation might have come due to competition with other mammals in the region, such as the various metatherians.

Ecology
The Milk River Formation is a rich fossil environment that covered near-shore and terrestrial deposits. It included a few dinosaur species like Saurornitholestes and Acrotholus, as well as a variety of other vertebrate such as the crocodilian Gilchristosuchus, various turtles and fish.

The mammalian fauna was primarily dominated by metatherians and multituberculates, as usual for Late Cretaceous mammaliafaunas, but a variety of older taxa remained; besides Alticonodon, there was also the symmetrodont Symmetrodontoides, and Potamotelses and picopsids. These were the last non-therian mammals (other than the highly successful multituberculates) in North America, suggesting a relictual element to the region's fauna.

References

Triconodontidae
Late Cretaceous mammals of North America
Mesozoic mammals of North America
Cretaceous animals of North America
Fossil taxa described in 1969
Milk River Formation
Taxa named by Richard C. Fox
Prehistoric mammal genera